The anarchist insurrection of December 1933, also known as the December 1933 Revolution, was a revolutionary general strike accompanied by the action of armed militias that had its epicenter in the city of Zaragoza, and in general in Aragón and La Rioja. It tried to implement libertarian communism, and that it extended by points of Extremadura, Andalusia, Catalunya and the mining basin of León. December 1933 was the third and last of the insurrections carried out by the CNT during the Second Republic.

It began in Zaragoza on December 8, 1933, the same day that the new Republican Courts met after the electoral victory of the center-right Radical Republican Party and the Catholic right of the CEDA. By one week later, on December 15, the insurrection had been completely dominated by law enforcement and even by the intervention of the army. On December 18, the first government of the Radical Republican Party was formed, chaired by Alejandro Lerroux during the Second Biennium of the Second Spanish Republic, with support from outside the CEDA.

History

Beginnings 

The new government had not yet been constituted, when the third anarchist insurrection in the history of the Republic broke out. The decision had been taken as soon as the result of the first round of the November 1933 elections was known in a National Plenary Session of the CNT held in Zaragoza on November 26. A revolutionary committee in charge of organizing the revolt emerged from, among others, Buenaventura Durruti, Cipriano Mera, Antonio Ejarque and Joaquín Ascaso, many of them members of the FAI. On the same day the new Cortes were opened, on December 8, the civil governor of Zaragoza ordered the closure of the CNT premises as a preventive measure and deployed law enforcement onto the streets, which caused shootings and confrontations between policemen and the revolutionaries to spread. In a city paralyzed by the strike, twelve people died on only the first day. On December 14 a state of war was declared and the army intervened to restore order, assault guards escorted the soldiers by the trams. On December 15 the CNT gave the order to return to work and the next day the police arrested the revolutionary committee.

Development 
The insurrectionary movement that began in Zaragoza spread to other towns in Aragon and La Rioja. Where libertarian communism was proclaimed, the most serious events took place, all of them following a similar scheme: attempt to seize the Civil Guard barracks, arrest of the authorities and “wealthy” people, burning of property files and official documents and supply of products “in accordance with the norms libertarian communism”. The government response was always the same: a harsh repression.

There were also anarchist uprisings in isolated points of Extremadura, Andalusia, Catalunya and the mining basin of León, which was completely dominated by December 15.

Consequences 
The balance of the seven days of the anarchist insurrection was 75 dead and 101 wounded, among the insurgents, and 11 civil guards and 3 assault guards killed and 45 and 18 wounded, respectively, among law enforcement. For its part, the failure left the CNT broken and disjointed, and without organs of expression. The more moderate trade union leaders who had been expelled from the CNT, such as Juan Peiró from the Libertarian Syndicalist Federation, blamed the disaster on the most radical faction of anarcho-syndicalism, the FAI, whose members had dominated the "revolutionary committee" of the insurrection. 

During the insurrection, there were violent clashes with the police force, train derailments, explosions, destruction of files, burning of churches, sabotage of railways and bridges, as well as telegraph and telephone lines, along with numerous shootings and skirmishes. Nineteen died due to the derailment of the Barcelona-Seville high speed train, in Puzol.

See also 
 Anarchist insurrection of Alt Llobregat
 Anarchist insurrection of January 1933
 Regional Defense Council of Aragon

References

Revolutions in Spain
History of Aragon
1933 in Spain
20th-century revolutions
Conflicts in 1933
Anarchism in Spain